Minuscule 881 (in the Gregory-Aland numbering), Θε51 (von Soden), is a 15th-century Greek minuscule manuscript of the New Testament on paper. It has complex contents.

Description 

The codex contains the text of the four Gospels, with a commentary, on 523 paper leaves (size ). The leaves were arranged in three volumes (171 + 171 + 181 leaves). The text is written in one column per page, 31 lines per page.
It was written by two scribes. The commentary is of Theophylact's authorship.
It has many marginal notes.

Text 
The Greek text of the codex Kurt Aland did not place it in any Category.
It was not examined by the Claremont Profile Method.

History 

According to F. H. A. Scrivener it was written in the 13th century, according to C. R. Gregory in the 15th century. Currently the manuscript is dated by the INTF to the 15th century.

The manuscript was added to the list of New Testament manuscripts by Scrivener (707e, 708e, 709e), Gregory (881e). Gregory saw it in 1886.

It was examined and described by Ernesto Feron and Fabiano Battaglini.

Currently the manuscript is housed at the Vatican Library (Ottobonianus gr. 453, 454, 455), in Rome.

See also 

 List of New Testament minuscules (1–1000)
 Biblical manuscript
 Textual criticism
 Minuscule 880

References

Further reading

External links 
 

Greek New Testament minuscules
15th-century biblical manuscripts
Manuscripts of the Vatican Library